Ian MacDougall Hacking   (born February 18, 1936) is a Canadian philosopher specializing in the philosophy of science. Throughout his career, he has won numerous awards, such as the Killam Prize for the Humanities and the Balzan Prize, and been a member of many prestigious groups, including the Order of Canada, the Royal Society of Canada and the British Academy.

Life 

Born in Vancouver, British Columbia, Canada, he earned undergraduate degrees from the University of British Columbia (1956) and the University of Cambridge (1958), where he was a student at Trinity College. Hacking also earned his PhD at Cambridge (1962), under the direction of Casimir Lewy, a former student of G. E. Moore.

He started his teaching career as an instructor at Princeton University in 1960 but, after just one year, moved to the University of Virginia as an assistant professor. After working as a research fellow at Cambridge from 1962 to 1964, he taught at his alma mater, UBC, first as an assistant professor and later as an associate professor from 1964 to 1969. He became a lecturer at Cambridge in 1969 before shifting to Stanford University in 1974. After teaching for several years at Stanford, he spent a year at the Center for Interdisciplinary Research in Bielefeld, Germany, from 1982 to 1983. Hacking was promoted to Professor of Philosophy at the University of Toronto in 1983 and University Professor, the highest honour the University of Toronto bestows on faculty, in 1991. From 2000 to 2006, he held the Chair of Philosophy and History of Scientific Concepts at the Collège de France. Hacking is the first Anglophone to be elected to a permanent chair in the Collège's history. After retiring from the Collège de France, Hacking was a professor of philosophy at UC Santa Cruz, from 2008 to 2010. He concluded his teaching career in 2011 as a visiting professor at the University of Cape Town.

Philosophical work

Influenced by debates involving Thomas Kuhn, Imre Lakatos, Paul Feyerabend and others, Hacking is known for bringing a historical approach to the philosophy of science. The fourth edition (2010) of Feyerabend's 1975 book Against Method, and the 50th anniversary edition (2012) of Kuhn's The Structure of Scientific Revolutions include an Introduction by Hacking. He is sometimes described as a member of the "Stanford School" in philosophy of science, a group that also includes John Dupré, Nancy Cartwright and Peter Galison. Hacking himself still identifies as a Cambridge analytic philosopher. Hacking has been a main proponent of a realism about science called "entity realism." This form of realism encourages a realistic stance towards answers to the scientific unknowns hypothesized by mature sciences (of the future), but skepticism towards current scientific theories. Hacking has also been influential in directing attention to the experimental and even engineering practices of science, and their relative autonomy from theory. Because of this, Hacking moved philosophical thinking a step further than the initial historical, but heavily theory-focused, turn of Kuhn and others.

After 1990, Hacking shifted his focus somewhat from the natural sciences to the human sciences, partly under the influence of the work of Michel Foucault. Foucault was an influence as early as 1975 when Hacking wrote Why Does Language Matter to Philosophy? and The Emergence of Probability. In the latter book, Hacking proposed that the modern schism between subjective or personalistic probability, and the long-run frequency interpretation, emerged in the early modern era as an epistemological "break" involving two incompatible models of uncertainty and chance. As history, the idea of a sharp break has been criticized, but competing 'frequentist' and 'subjective' interpretations of probability still remain today. Foucault's approach to knowledge systems and power is also reflected in Hacking's work on the historical mutability of psychiatric disorders and institutional roles for statistical reasoning in the 19th century. He labels his approach to the human sciences transcendental nominalism<ref>See Transcendence (philosophy) and Nominalism.</ref> (also dynamic nominalism or dialectical realism), a historicised form of nominalism that traces the mutual interactions over time between the phenomena of the human world and our conceptions and classifications of them.

In Rewriting the Soul: Multiple Personality and the Sciences of Memory, by developing a historical ontology of multiple personality disorder, Hacking provides a discussion of how people are constituted by the descriptions of acts available to them (see Acting under a description).

In Mad Travelers (1998) Hacking provided a historical account of the effects of a medical condition known as fugue in the late 1890s. Fugue, also known as "mad travel," is a diagnosable type of insanity in which European men would walk in a trance for hundreds of miles without knowledge of their identities.

 Awards and lectures 

In 2002, Hacking was awarded the first Killam Prize for the Humanities, Canada's most distinguished award for outstanding career achievements. He was made a Companion of the Order of Canada in 2004. Hacking was appointed visiting professor at University of California, Santa Cruz for the Winters of 2008 and 2009. On August 25, 2009, Hacking was named winner of the Holberg International Memorial Prize, a Norwegian award for scholarly work in the arts and humanities, social sciences, law and theology. Hacking was chosen for his work on how statistics and the theory of probability have shaped society.

In 2003, he gave the Sigmund H. Danziger Jr. Memorial Lecture in the Humanities, and in 2010 he gave the René Descartes Lectures at the Tilburg Center for Logic and Philosophy of Science (TiLPS). Hacking also gave the Howison lectures at the University of California, Berkeley, on the topic of mathematics and its sources in human behavior ('Proof, Truth, Hands and Mind') in 2010. In 2012, Hacking was awarded the Austrian Decoration for Science and Art, and in 2014 he was awarded the Balzan Prize.

 Selected works 

Books

Hacking's works have been translated into several languages. His works include:
 The Logic of Statistical Inference (1965)
 The Emergence of Probability (1975)
 Why Does Language Matter to Philosophy? (1975)
 Representing and Intervening, Introductory Topics in the Philosophy of Natural Science, Cambridge University Press, Cambridge, UK, 1983.
 The Taming of Chance (1990)
 Scientific Revolutions (1990)
 Rewriting the Soul: Multiple Personality and the Sciences of Memory (1995)
 Mad Travelers: Reflections on the Reality of Transient Mental Illnesses (1998)
 The Social Construction of What? (1999)
 An Introduction to Probability and Inductive Logic (2001)
 Historical Ontology (2002)
 Why Is There Philosophy of Mathematics at All?'' (2014)

Chapters in books

Articles
 
 1979: "What is Logic?", Journal of Philosophy 76(6), reprinted in A Philosophical Companion to First Order Logic (1993), edited by R.I.G. Hughes
 
 
 
 2007: "Root and Branch ", The Nation
 2012: "Putnam's Theory of Natural Kinds and Their Names is Not the Same as Kripke's", Hurly-Burly 7: 129–149.

References

Further reading

External links 

Official Website
Hacking, Ian  in The Canadian Encyclopedia
Ian Hacking archival papers held at the University of Toronto Archives and Records Management Services

1936 births
Living people
People from Vancouver
20th-century American philosophers
21st-century American philosophers
Canadian philosophers
Academic staff of the Collège de France
Philosophers of language
Companions of the Order of Canada
Recipients of the Austrian Decoration for Science and Art
Philosophers of science
University of British Columbia alumni
Alumni of Trinity College, Cambridge
Academic staff of the University of Toronto
Stanford University Department of Philosophy faculty
Fellows of the British Academy
Analytic philosophers
Holberg Prize laureates